Finley is both a surname and given name. Its meaning is of Scottish origin, from the Gaelic personal name Fionnlagh (Old Irish Findlaech), composed of the elements fionn "white", "fair" (see Finn) + laoch "warrior", "hero", which led many people believe that has been reinforced by an Old Norse personal name composed of the elements finn "Finn" + leikr "fight", "battle", "hero".

Finley is a popular given name both in the United States and the United Kingdom. It is in use for both boys and girls in the United States. as of 2017 the name Finley no longer only refers to "fair headed" people. There are all kinds of different races & backgrounds with the name Finley.  It has been more common for boys than girls in the United Kingdom.

Notable people with the name include:

Surname 
Albert Ernest Finley (1870 –1923), Canadian physician and political figure 
Amy Finley (born 1973), American cook and writer
Art Finley (1926—2015), American television and radio personality
Asa Finley (1788–1853), first elected judge of Arrow Rock, Missouri, 1824
Ben Finley broadcast journalist who is the Editorial Producer with “Anderson Cooper 360” which broadcasts on CNN
Bob Finley (1915–1986), American baseball catcher
Brian Finley (born 1981), Canadian ice hockey player
Carl A. Finley (1924–2002), American minority owner of the Kansas City A's
Colin James Finley (Born 1971), Award Winning Singer-songwriter 
Chad Finley (born 1992), American professional stock car racing driver and team owner
Charles Finley (politician) (1865–1941), U.S. Representative from Kentucky
Charles Finley (coach) (1907–1972), college basketball coach for the Idaho Vandals, UTEP Miners, Southern Miss Golden Eagles
Charles M. Finley (1899–1958), businessman and politician from Philadelphia
Charlie Finley (1918–1996), businessman and Oakland Athletics owner
Chuck Finley (born 1962), American baseball pitcher
Clement Finley (1797–1879), 10th Surgeon General of the United States Army
David Finley Jr. (born 1958), Northern Irish professional wrestling trainer, producer and former professional wrestler
David E. Finley (1861–1917), United States Representative from South Carolina
Diane Finley (born 1957), Canadian politician
Donna Finley, American politician
Doug Finley (1946–2013), Canadian politician and Campaign Director for the Conservative Party of Canada during 2006 and 2008 elections
Ebenezer B. Finley (1833–1916) was a U.S. Representative from Ohio, nephew of Stephen Ross Harris
Evelyn Finley (1916–1989), American actress and stuntwoman
Francis Finley (1882 – c. 1943), British-born Australian rugby union player
Frank Finley Merriam (186 –1955), the 28th governor of California from 1934 to 1939
Gary Finley (born 1970), English former professional football central defender and non-league manager
Gary Wade Finley Jr., American multiple time champion
Gerald Finley (born 1960), Canadian bass-baritone opera singer
Gerry Finley-Day (born 1947), Scottish comics writer
Gregory Finley (born 1984), American actor
Guy Finley (born 1949), American self-help writer, philosopher, spiritual teacher, and former professional songwriter and musician
Hala Finley (born 2009), American actress
Holly Finale' Finley, American professional disc golfer 
Hugh F. Finley (1833–1909), U.S. Representative from Kentucky, father of Charles Finley
James Finley (engineer) (1756–1828), American judge and bridge designer
James Finley (minister) (1725–1795), American Presbyterian minister
James I. Finley, American former Deputy Under Secretary of Defense for Acquisition and Technology in the U.S. Department of Defense
James "John" Finley Gruber (1928–2011), American teacher and early LGBT rights activist
James Bradley Finley (1781–1856), United States Methodist elder and minister
Jeanne C. Finley (born 1962) American artist who works with representational media including film, photography, and video
Jeffrey Finley (born 1991), Canadian football player
Jermichael Finley (born 1987), American football tight end
Jesse J. Finley (1812–1904), American member of the United States House of Representatives from Florida and the mayor of Memphis
Joe Finley (born 1987), American ice hockey player
John Finley (musician) (born 1945), Canadian singer/songwriter 
John Finley Williamson (1887–1964), American founder of the Westminster Choir and co-founder of Westminster Choir College
John Huston Finley (1863–1940), American educator
John "Jack" Lawrence Finley (1935–2006), a United States Navy aviator and astronaut
John Park Finley (1854–1943), American meteorologist and Army officer; tornado researcher
Jonathan Finley (born 1972), British-German physicist
Joseph Cameron Finley (born 1987), American former child actor and molecular biologist
Julie Finley the United States Ambassador to the Organization for Security and Co-operation in Europe (OSCE)
Karen Finley (born 1956), American performance artist
Lucinda Finley (born 1950), American professor and attorney appellant
Lucy Sherrard Atkinson (née Finley) (1817–1893), English explorer and author who travelled throughout Central Asia and Siberia
Martha Finley (1828–1909), teacher, author
Mason Finley (born 1990), American shot putter and discus thrower
Matt Finley (born 1951), American flugelhorn player and composer of Brazilian jazz
Michael Finley (born 1973), American basketball player
Mike Finley (1950–2020), American writer, poet, and videographer
Mitch Finley (born 1945), American religious writer
Morgan M. Finley (1925–2016), American politician and businessman
Moses I. Finley (1912–1986), American and English historian
Otis E. Finley Sr. (1898–1979), American football coach
Reginald Vaughn Finley Sr. (born 1974), American internet radio host and atheist
Robert Finley (1772–1817), American academic, minister and co-organizer of the colonization movement to Liberia
Robert Finley (musician), American blues and soul singer-songwriter and guitarist.
Ron Finley, American fashion designer
Ron Finley (American football), American former football coach
Ronald Finley[ (1940–2016), American wrestler
Ruth Finley (1920–2018), American businesswoman who was the founder and publisher of The Fashion Calendar 
Ryan Finley (businessman), American founder of SurveyMonkey, an online survey software provider
Ryan Finley (soccer) (born 1991), American former professional soccer player
Ryan Finley (American football) (born 1994), American football player
Sam Finley (born 1992), English professional football midfielder 
Samuel Finley (1715–1766), American Presbyterian minister and prominent academic
Samuel Finley Brown Morse (1885–1969), American environmental conservationist and the developer
Samuel Finley Patterson (1799–1874), American politician, planter, and businessman 
Samuel Finley Vinton (1792–1862), American member of the United States House of Representatives from Ohio
Stephanie A. Finley (born 1966), American judge
Steve Finley (born 1965), American baseball center fielder
Susan G. Finley, an American researcher and the longest-serving woman in NASA
T. J. Finley (born 2002), American football player
William James Finley (1863–1912), American professional baseball player
William Asa Finley (1839–1912), first president of Oregon State University in the United States
William Finley (actor) (1940–2012), American actor 
William L. Finley (1876–1953), American wildlife photographer and conservationist
William Finley (actor), American film actor

Given name
Finley Duncan (died 1989), American singer who worked with independent record companies in Florida
Finley Jeffrey (born 1969), also known as "Scholar" and "King Scholar", American Grenadian calypsonian, Soca Artiste and songwrite
Finley Peter Dunne (1867–1936), American writer and humorist
Finley Lockwood (born 2008), daughter of Lisa Marie Presley and Michael Lockwood
Finley Quaye (born 1974), Scottish musician
William Finley Semple (1832–1923), American dentist, commonly referred to as the first person anywhere to patent a chewing gum

References

English-language surnames
Scottish surnames
English-language unisex given names